Eumorpha achemon, the Achemon sphinx, is a moth of the family Sphingidae. The species was first described by Dru Drury in 1773.

Distribution 
It is native to North America, where it is known from most of the United States, southern Canada, and northern Mexico. It is rare or absent in the Pacific Northwest, Great Basin, and Southeastern United States except Florida.

Description 
The wingspan is 87–97 mm. It can be distinguished from all other Eumorpha species by the hindwing upperside being almost uniformly pale pink from the base to the diffuse, dark brown submarginal band.

Larvae are of three forms: light green, reddish orange, and tan to brown.

Biology 
Adults are on wing from June to August in one generation in the northern part of the range. There are two generations with adults on wing from May to August in the south. Adults feed on the nectar of various flowers, including Lonicera japonica, Petunia × atkinsiana, Philadelphus coronarius, and Phlox species. It is one of five main pollinators of the rare orchid Platanthera praeclara.

They are known to feed on Parthenocissus quinquefolia and Ampelopsis species. They are often found on wild and cultivated Vitaceae, including grapes, and they can sometimes be found in vineyards feeding on the leaves.

References

External links

"Moth Caterpillars Feeding on Virginia Creeper (Parthenocissus quinquefolia)". Illinois Wildflowers. Archived January 9, 2009.

Eumorpha
Moths described in 1773
Moths of North America
Taxa named by Dru Drury